All Hail the Queen is the debut album by hip-hop artist Queen Latifah. The album was released on November 7, 1989, through Tommy Boy Records. The feminist anthem, "Ladies First" featuring Monie Love remains one of Latifah's signature songs.

All Hail the Queen peaked at no. 6 on the Billboard Top Hip Hop/R&B Albums chart and at no. 124 on the Billboard 200 chart. "Wrath of My Madness" was the first single from All Hail the Queen, and was later sampled in Yo-Yo's "You Can't Play With My Yo-Yo". "Mama Gave Birth to the Soul Children" peaked at no. 14 in the UK.

Critical reception

In 1998, All Hail the Queen was included in The Sources "100 Best Albums" list. It was later featured in Robert Dimery's 1001 Albums You Must Hear Before You Die.

In 2008, the single "Ladies First" was ranked number 35 on VH1's 100 Greatest Songs Of Hip Hop.

Track listing

Personnel
Daddy O	 - 	Producer, Performer, Mixing
De La Soul	 - 	Performer
Dr. Jam	 - 	Remixing
KRS-One	 - 	Producer, Mixing
Queen Latifah	 - 	Producer, Mixing
Monie Love	 - 	Performer
DJ Mark the 45 King	 - 	Producer, Performer, Mixing
Paul C.	 - 	Engineer, Mixing
Prince Paul	 - 	Producer, Mixing
Soulshock	 - 	Remixing
Dwayne Sumal	 - 	Engineer
Rob Sutton	 - 	Mixing
Ted Jensen    -   Mastering
Mike Teelucksingh	 - 	Engineer
Little Louie Vega	 - 	Producer, Mixing
Dr. Shane Faber	 - 	Guitar (Bass), Engineer
Dan Miller	 - 	Engineer, Mixing
Bob Coulter	 - 	Engineer, Mixing
Al Watts	 - 	Engineer, Mixing
Steven Miglio	 - 	Artwork, Design, Layout Design
Dante Ross	 - 	Production Coordination, Production Consultant
Ultimatum	 - 	Remixing
Dilly d'Mus	 - 	Assistant Engineer
Louis Vego	 - 	Producer, Mixing
Howard Zucker	 - 	Typography
Jane Wexler	 - 	Photography
Bart Everly	 - 	Photography
Christopher Shaw	 - 	Engineer
Dan Miller	 - 	Mixing
Gawthaman Gobinath	 - 	Make-up Artist
Dana Mozie      -      DMV Regional Record Promoter

Charts

Weekly charts

Year-end charts

Charting singles

See also
 Album era

References

External links

All Hail the Queen (Adobe Flash) at Radio3Net (streamed copy where licensed)

Queen Latifah albums
1989 debut albums
Tommy Boy Records albums
Albums produced by Prince Paul (producer)
Albums produced by KRS-One
Albums produced by the 45 King